Australia was represented in the first Paralympic Paratriathlon event at the Rio 2016 Summer Paralympics.

Medal Tally

Summer Paralympic Games

2016 Rio

Australia was represented by:

Men - Nic Beveridge (d), Bill Chaffey (d), Brant Garvey (d)
Women - Kate Doughty (d), Katie Kelly (d), Michellie Jones (d) (guide for Kelly), Claire McLean 
Officials - Team Leader - Kathryn Periac ; Assistant Team Leader/Coach - Craig Redman  ; Coaches - Corey Bacon, Shaun D’Auria ; Mechanic/Handler -  Mechanic/ Handler ; Handler - Darren Tattersall  
Katie Kelly  with guide Michellie Jones won a gold medal.

2020 Tokyo

Australia was represented by: 
Men -  Nic Beveridge, Jonathan Goerlach (d), Dave Mainwaring (guide for Goerlach) (d),  David Bryant (d)
Women- Katie Kelly, Briarna Silk (guide) for Kelly (d), Lauren Parker (d), Emily Tapp (d) 
Coaches - Dan Atkins, Danielle Stefano, Megan Hall  
Officials - Para Lead - Kyle Burns,  Bike Mechanic - Onishi Shoji, Fixer - Kiyomi Niwata, Handler - Brad Fernley, Fabrizio Andreon, Matthew Pilbeam    

Lauren Parker won the silver medal in the Women's PTWC.

Detailed Australian Results

(d) Paralympic Games debut

References

See also
Paratriathlon at the Summer Paralympics
Australia at the Paralympics

Australian Paralympic teams
 Triathlon in Australia